Icmadophila is a genus of crustose lichen. The genus has a widespread distribution in the Northern Hemisphere and contains six species.  The only species found in North America, Icmadophila ericetorum, has a mint green crustose thallus that is dotted with bright pink apothecial disks, and is sometimes colloquially referred to as "fairy puke".  It aggressively grows over mosses on well-rotted wood and peat.  It looks very distinctive, but may be confused with species of Dibaeis.

References

Pertusariales
Lichen genera
Taxa described in 1852
Pertusariales genera
Taxa named by Vittore Benedetto Antonio Trevisan de Saint-Léon